In marketing, iAPX (Intel Advanced Performance Architecture with X standing in for the Greek letter χ (chi), romanised as "ch") was a short lived designation used for several Intel microprocessors, including some 8086 family processors. Not being a simple initialism seems to have confused even Intel's technical writers as can be seen in their iAPX-88 Book where the asterisked expansion shows iAPX to mean Intel Advanced Processor System.

The iAPX prefix originally belonged to the Intel iAPX 432 architecture, alias Intel 8800. However, as this radical design failed in the marketplace, Intel also tried it on its more conventional 8086-family of processors, mainly used as a kind of system prefix but also to denote individual processors in the family. The 8086 based line was therefore called the iAPX 86 series for a few years during the early 1980s. This was abandoned rather soon, however. The industry around the 8088- and 80286-based de facto standard of IBM PC and IBM AT designs also seldom used that naming scheme. As a result, the iAPX prefix is now, again, more closely associated with the (non-x86) iAPX 432 architecture (which, although a commercial failure, is often seen as historically important).

List of x86-related iAPX chips and multi-chip system configurations
 iAPX 86 and iAPX 86/10 refer to the 8086
 iAPX 86/11 refers to a combination of 8086 and 8089 (IOP)
 iAPX 86/20 refers to a combination of 8086 and 8087 (NPX)
 iAPX 86/21 refers to a combination of 8086, 8087 and 8089
 iAPX 86/30 refers to a combination of 8086 and 80130 (OSP)
 iAPX 88 and iAPX 88/10 refers to the 8088
 iAPX 88/11 refers to a combination of 8088 and 8089
 iAPX 88/20 refers to a combination of 8088 and 8087
 iAPX 88/21 refers to a combination of 8088, 8087 and 8089
 iAPX 88/30 refers to a combination of 8088 and 80130
 iAPX 186 and iAPX 186/10 refer to the 80186
 iAPX 186/11 refers to a combination of 80186 and 8089
 iAPX 186/20 refers to a combination of 80186 and 8087
 iAPX 186/21 refers to a combination of 80186, 8087 and 8089
 iAPX 186/30 refers to a combination of 80186 and 80130
 iAPX 186/40 refers to a combination of 80186, 8087 and 80130
 iAPX 188  and iAPX 188/10 refer to the 80188
 iAPX 188/20 refers to a combination of 80188 and 8087
 iAPX 188/21 refers to a combination of 80188, 8087 and 8089
 iAPX 188/30 refers to a combination of 80188 and 80130
 iAPX 286 and iAPX 286/10 refer to the 80286
 iAPX 286/20 refers to a combination of 80286 and 80287
 iAPX 386 refers to the 80386

List of non-x86 iAPX chips
 Intel iAPX 432

References

Intel microprocessors